Bryan Keith Strauchan (pronounced "Strawn"), better known as "Strauchanie" (pronounced "Strawny"), is a fictional Australian rules football player played by Peter Helliar, who first appeared during short sketches on Before the Game.

Strauchanie is represented as a talentless, overweight bogan, oblivious to his own lack of ability, who occupied a position on the Collingwood Football Club's playing list until he announced his retirement in early April 2009 on Triple M.

Through his regular segment on Before the Game, Strauchanie became a popular character for his combination of country football stereotypes and jokes about contemporary issues in the AFL. Strauchan has since made celebrity appearances, often performing in charity sports events.

Character
Bryan Strauchan was born in 1984 to Roy and Soy Bean Strauchan in the country town of Horsham, Victoria. He is of Asian descent through his maternal parentage, although his appearance shows no physical Asian traits. He is renowned for his illeism (i.e., referring to himself in the third person).

He played his formative years of football in Horsham, reaching no higher than the reserves; nevertheless, he was supposedly selected by the Collingwood Football Club with the last pick in the 2004 National Draft. Strauchan's progress was hampered by weight issues, lack of speed, lack of skills, and a crippling peanut allergy. He wore guernsey number 59, indicative of his mediocrity (AFL players seldom retain numbers higher than 40 longer than their junior years and almost never wear numbers higher than 50). He never made his Australian Football League (AFL) debut; however, former Collingwood coach Mick Malthouse had hinted that promotion may have been around the corner. Strauchan was purportedly named in the senior team for Collingwood's match against Sydney in 2005, but he had accidentally locked himself in a stairwell, which caused him to miss the game. He also has his own AFL footy card that describes all of his mediocre abilities.

Strauchan has been involved in a relationship with real-life boundary rider Christi Malthouse, although incidences of infidelity are frequent. He has claimed that the reason he was not selected for play is that selectors are biased against Asians, but he was selected as captain in the Asian Team of the Century.

He was man of the match in the 2009 E.J. Whitten Legends Game after kicking three goals. Late in the match, however, Strauchan injured his ankle after a tackle, putting the rest of his career in doubt. Although it appeared to be a joke at first, Strauchan did actually injure his ankle severely.

Bryan Strauchan suffered a shocking lower-leg injury during the 2012 E.J. Whitten Legends Game that has possibly ended his football-playing days for good.

In 2012, in a move by the fans, Strauchanie was voted President of the Melbourne Renegades.

For the role, Helliar dons a blonde mullet wig and attempts to play up an Australian bogan stereotype. The comedy is achieved by self-effacing humour, putting Strauchan in situations that highlight his weight, lack of fitness and general inability, while his egotistical personality and delusions of grandeur mean he is completely unaware of these weaknesses. The character of Strauchanie has made several subsequent appearances across different media.

Media and celebrity appearances

Strauchan was a recurring character on the show Before the Game, which features regular 2- to 5-minute segments about the goings-on in Strauchan's life. Collingwood Football Club personalities, including coach Mick Malthouse, president Eddie McGuire and various senior players, have appeared and co-operated with sketches which pretend to place Strauchan inside the real-life workings of the club.

Additionally, Bryan Strauchan has made celebrity appearances on several occasions in both the media and in sports. These include:
Hosting a comedy segment at the 2006 Brownlow Medal count.
Appearing in the Australian Football League's membership advertisements.
Participating in the 2007 through 2011 EJ Whitten Legends Games for Victoria, as co-captain in 2008 (wearing his number 59 guernsey).
Participating in the Twenty20 Celebrity Challenge, a charity cricket match played for the Shane Warne Foundation.
Participating in the 2008 Australian Grand Prix celebrity race.
Appearing at Parade College for a fundraiser on 5 November 2009.
Appearing at the Big Freeze in 2015 to help fight motor neuron disease.
Doing crunches in 2020 to help support Redkite, a charity that supports young cancer patients up to the ages of 18.

Career highlights
 Final pick, 2004 National Draft
 Captain of All-Asian Team of the Century
 E. J. Whitten Legends Game 2007, 2008, 2009, 2010, 2011, 2012
 Co-captain of Victoria (EJ Whitten Legends Game) (2008)
 Man of the Match (EJ Whitten Legends Game) (2009)

Merchandise

Bryan Strauchan wrote an autobiography Bryan Strauchan – my story: the rise and rise of a genuine superstar of Australian sport. In it, Strauchan talks about his Horsham days, playing for Collingwood, and being Chinese. Strauchan, released the autobiography in front of a packed media conference at Collingwood's headquarters, the Lexus Centre, with Nathan Buckley helping promote it.

A DVD featuring all of Strauchan's clips was released in 2006. The DVD is titled as Strauchanie – Pure B.S., which is a play on words, as the "B.S." in the title can refer both to Strauchan's initials and also the word "bullshit". The video has since been uploaded to YouTube in full.

References

Further reading
 Helliar, Peter and Paul Calleja. Bryan Strauchan: My story: The rise and rise of a genuine superstar of Australian sport. Sydney: Allen & Unwin, 2007.

External links

Official website
Bryan Strauchan at YouTube

Comedy television characters
Fictional Australian rules football players
Fictional people from Victoria (Australia)
Fictional illeists